A refugee is a person who has left their home country under threat of their life, and cannot or will not return there. 

Refugee or Refugees may also refer to:

Literature and art
The Refugee, alternative pirated 1865 publication title of the novel Israel Potter by Herman Melville
The Refugee (play) Der Flüchtling, by Fritz Hochwälder 1945
Refugee (Gratz novel), a 2017 young adult novel by Alan Gratz
Refugee (Anthony novel), a 1983 novel by Piers Anthony
Refugees (drama), a 1999 play by Zlatko Topčić
Refugees (Kazaks), a 1917 painting by Jēkabs Kazaks

Film and television
The Refugee (film), a 1918 film directed by Cecil Hepworth
Refugee (2000 film), an Indian film
Refugee (2006 film), a Bengali film
Refugees (1933 film), a German film directed by Gustav Ucicky
Refugees (film) (逃亡]]a Chinese people
"Refugees" (The Wire), an episode of The Wire

Music
"The Refugee", by composer Karl Weigl Mary Hoxie Jones 
Refugee (band), a British progressive rock band

Albums
Refugee (Refugee album), 1974
Refugee (Samson album), 1990
Refugee (Bad4Good album), 1992
Refugees (EP), an EP by Embrace
Refugee (Various Artists), collaborative charity album

Songs
 "Refugee", by Skip Marley, 2017
"Refugees" (Embrace song), 2014
"Refugee" (Jim Kerr song), 2010
"Refugees" (The Tears song), 2005
"The Refugee" (U2 song), 1983
"Refugee" (Tom Petty and the Heartbreakers song), 1980
"Refugees" (Van der Graaf Generator song), 1970

See also 
Refuge (disambiguation)
The Refugees (disambiguation)
Fugees, an American hip-hop group whose name is derived from "refugees"